Boocksee is a lake in Thelkow, a municipality in the Rostock district in Mecklenburg-Vorpommern, Germany. At an elevation of 24.2 m, its surface area is 0.073 km².

Lakes of Mecklenburg-Western Pomerania